Ramazan Tunç (born 17 September 1975) is a former Turkish international footballer. He last played for Polatlı Bugsaşspor.

References

1975 births
Living people
Turkish footballers
Turkey international footballers
Turkey under-21 international footballers
Gaziantepspor footballers
Diyarbakırspor footballers
Ankaraspor footballers

Association football defenders
Mediterranean Games silver medalists for Turkey
Competitors at the 1997 Mediterranean Games
Mediterranean Games medalists in football